Verna Allee (born 1949 in Kansas,  United States) is an American business consultant and writer on topics including value networks, knowledge management, organizational intelligence, intellectual capital and the value conversion of intangibles.

Allee holds a B.A. in Social Science, and an M.A. in Human Consciousness, specializing in Organizational Leadership.

Verna Allee has authored or co-authored three books on value networks and organizational knowledge. Her book The Knowledge Evolution: Expanding Organizational Intelligence offers a road map for understanding knowledge creation, learning, and performance in everyday work. The book The Future of Knowledge: Increasing Prosperity through Value Networks is about how the networked organization can be understood at a practical everyday level.

Allee is CEO of Value Networks LLC. She lives in Martinez, California, USA.

Books
 1997:  The Knowledge Evolution: Expanding Organizational Intelligence. Butterworth-Heinemann Business Books.  , .
 2002:  The Future of Knowledge: Increasing Prosperity Through Value Networks.  Butterworth-Heinemann Business Books.  , .
 2003/4:  What is True Wealth & How Do We Create It?  Verna Allee and Dinesh Chandra, eds.  New Delhi: Indigo Press.  .

References

External links
 Verna Allee website.
 Inside Knowledge Magazine.
 World Business Academy website.

Living people
Writers from California
Writers from Kansas
1949 births
20th-century American businesspeople
20th-century American businesswomen
21st-century American women